The Revolutionary Left in Spain, 1914–1923, is a 1974 history of Spanish labor and the left written by Gerald H. Meaker.

References

External links 

 

1974 non-fiction books
English-language books
Stanford University Press books
History books about Spain